Roman generals were often career statesmen, remembered by history for reasons other than their service in the Roman Army. This page encompasses men whom history remembers for their accomplishments commanding Roman armies on land and sea.

A
 Manius Acilius Glabrio (consul 67 BC)
 Manius Acilius Glabrio (consul 191 BC)
 Titus Aebutius Elva
 Aegidius
 Lucius Aemilius Barbula
 Marcus Aemilius Lepidus (triumvir)
 Lucius Aemilius Paulus Macedonicus
 Marcus Aemilius Scaurus (praetor 56 BC)
 Marcus Antonius (orator)
 Gaius Antonius
 Lucius Antonius (brother of Mark Antony)
 Marcus Antonius Creticus
 Mark Antony
 Manius Aquillius (consul 129 BC)
 Arrian
 Lucius Artorius Castus
 Gaius Asinius Pollio (consul 40 BC)
 Aulus Atilius Calatinus
 Marcus Atilius Regulus
 Publius Attius Varus
 Aureolus
 Graltinus Maximus Aurelius

B
 Lucius Cornelius Balbus (minor) – defeated the Garamantes
 Barbatio
 Lucilius Bassus
 Publius Ventidius Bassus
 Bonifacius
 Bonosus (usurper)
 Decimus Junius Brutus Albinus – commanded Caesar's fleet in the war against the Veneti
 Decimus Junius Brutus Callaicus – led the Roman legions in the conquest of western Iberia
 Marcus Junius Brutus

C

 Quintus Caecilius Metellus
 Aulus Caecina Alienus
 Marcus Calpurnius Bibulus
 Gaius Calpurnius Piso (consul 67 BC)
 Gaius Carrinas (praetor 82 BC)
 Gaius Carrinas (consul 43 BC)
 Gaius Cassius Longinus
 Quintus Tullius Cicero
 Gaius Julius Civilis
 Appius Claudius Caudex
 Marcus Claudius Marcellus
 Gaius Claudius Nero
 Claudius Pompeianus
 Publius Claudius Pulcher (consul 249 BC)
 Lucius Clodius Macer
 Gnaeus Domitius Corbulo
 Gaius Marcius Coriolanus
 Lucius Cornelius Cinna
 Gnaeus Cornelius Lentulus Clodianus
 Publius Cornelius Lentulus Spinther
 Lucius Cornelius Lentulus Crus
 Scipio Aemilianus
 Scipio Africanus
 Scipio Asiaticus
 Lucius Cornelius Scipio Barbatus
 Publius Cornelius Scipio Nasica

D

 Publius Decius Mus (consul 279 BC) – fought Pyrrhus of Epirus at the Battle of Asculum (279 BC)
 Publius Decius Mus (consul 340 BC) – awarded the Grass Crown during First Samnite War
 Publius Decius Mus (consul 312 BC)
 Dexippus
 Aulus Didius Gallus
 Titus Didius
 Gnaeus Domitius Ahenobarbus (consul 32 BC)
 Gnaeus Domitius Ahenobarbus (consul 122 BC)
 Gnaeus Domitius Calvinus
 Nero Claudius Drusus
 Drusus Julius Caesar
 Gaius Duilius

F

 Quintus Fabius Maximus Rullianus
 Quintus Fabius Maximus Verrucosus
 Fabius Valens
 Gaius Flaminius
 Gaius Flavius Fimbria
 Quintus Fufius Calenus
 Fullofaudes
 Marcus Fulvius Flaccus (consul 125 BC)
 Marcus Fulvius Flaccus (consul 264 BC)
 Quintus Fulvius Flaccus (consul 237 BC)
 Quintus Fulvius Flaccus (consul 179 BC)
 Marcus Fulvius Nobilior
 Marcus Furius Camillus
 Flavius Aetius
 Cornelius Fuscus

G

 Aulus Gabinius
 Gaius Julius Caesar the Elder
 Servius Sulpicius Galba (praetor 54 BC)
 Cestius Gallus
 Lucius Gellius
 Lucius Gellius Publicola
 Germanicus
 Gundobad
 Gaius Salvius Liberalis

H
 Gnaeus Hosidius Geta – defeated Sabalus, chief of the Mauri

J
 Lucius Julius Caesar
 Julius Caesar
 Lucius Junius Brutus founder of Roman republic

L
 Titus Labienus
 Gaius Laelius
 Titus Larcius
 Marcus Aemilius Lepidus (consul 6)
 Publius Licinius Crassus Dives Mucianus
 Marcus Licinius Crassus
 Lucius Licinius Lucullus
 Litorius
 Lucullus
 Mucianus
 Quintus Ligarius
 Marcus Livius Salinator
 Marcus Lollius
 Quintus Lollius Urbicus
 Lucius Caecilius Metellus Denter
 Lucius Pinarius
 Gaius Lutatius Catulus
 Quintus Lutatius Catulus

M

 Gnaeus Mallius Maximus
 Titus Manlius Torquatus (consul 347 BC)
 Titus Manlius Torquatus (235 BC)
 Lucius Manlius Vulso Longus
 Gaius Marcius Rutilus
 Marcius Turbo
 Gaius Marius – initiated "Marian reforms" of the army
 Gaius Marius the Younger
 Lucius Mummius Achaicus
 Marcus Valerius Maximianus

N
 Tiberius Nero – commanded Caesar's fleet in the Alexandrian War
 Gaius Norbanus Flaccus
 Gaius Norbanus

O
 Gaius Octavius – put down a slave rebellion at Thurii •
 Gnaeus Octavius
 Odaenathus
 Lucius Opimius
 Publius Ostorius Scapula – responsible for the defeat and capture of Caratacus

P
 Gnaeus Papirius Carbo
 Lucius Papirius Cursor
 Tiberius Claudius Paulinus
 Marcus Perperna Vento
 Marcus Perperna
 Quintus Petillius Cerialis
 Publius Petronius Turpilianus
 Lucius Calpurnius Piso (consul 15 BC)
 Aulus Plautius
 Gnaeus Pompeius
 Pompey
 Sextus Pompeius
 Pompeius Strabo
 Pomponius Secundus
 Marcus Popillius Laenas
 Marcus Popillius Laenas (consul 173 BC)
 Lucius Postumius Albinus
 Marcus Antonius Primus
 Publius Cornelius Dolabella (consul 283 BC)
 Marcus Pupius Piso Frugi Calpurnianus

Q

 Lusius Quietus
 Lucius Quinctius Cincinnatus – dictator
 Publius Quinctilius Varus – lost three Roman legions and his own life when attacked by Germanic leader Arminius in the Battle of the Teutoburg Forest
 Titus Quinctius Flamininus
 Quintus Aemilius
 Quintus Pedius

R
 Ricimer
 Marcus Roscius Coelius
 Publius Rutilius Lupus (consul 90 BC)
 Publius Rutilius Rufus

S
 Quintus Salvidienus Rufus
 Gaius Scribonius Curio (consul 76 BC)
 Gaius Scribonius Curio (praetor 49 BC)
 Sejanus
 Tiberius Sempronius Gracchus (consul 238 BC)
 Tiberius Sempronius Gracchus (consul 215 BC)
 Tiberius Sempronius Gracchus (consul 177 BC)
 Tiberius Sempronius Longus (consul 194 BC)
 Tiberius Sempronius Longus (consul 218 BC)
 Marcus Sergius
 Quintus Sertorius
 Gaius Servilius Ahala
 Quintus Servilius Caepio (consul 106 BC)
 Gnaeus Servilius Geminus
 Quintus Servilius Caepio (quaestor 103 BC)
 Sextus Julius Severus
 Lucius Cornelius Sisenna
 Lucius Flavius Silva
 Gaius Sosius
 Staurakios
 Stilicho
 Gaius Suetonius Paulinus
 Publius Cornelius Sulla
Lucius Cornelius Sulla Felix
 Publius Sulpicius Galba Maximus
 Servius Sulpicius Galba (consul 144 BC)
 Publius Sulpicius Rufus
 Syagrius
 Scipio
 Sextus Calpurnius Classicus (senator and general of Hadrian)

T
 Marcus Terentius Varro Lucullus
 Gaius Terentius Varro
 Titus Vinius
 Trebonius

U
 Ursicinus (magister equitum) – Entrusted to suppress the Jewish revolt against Gallus (Constantius Gallus)

V
 Valens (usurper)
 Marcus Valerius Corvus
 Gaius Valerius Flaccus (consul)
 Lucius Valerius Flaccus
 Publius Valerius Laevinus
 Marcus Valerius Laevinus
 Manius Valerius Maximus Corvinus Messalla
 Marcus Valerius Messalla Corvinus
 Flavius Valila Theodosius
 Marcus Vipsanius Agrippa

Notes

Generals
Roman
Ancient Roman generals
Gen